This a list of notable alumni of Cleveland State University College of Law in Cleveland, Ohio. This list includes graduates of Cleveland Law School and John Marshall School of Law, which merged in 1946 to form Cleveland–Marshall, which was renamed the CSU College of Law in 2022.

List

References

External links

Cleveland-Marshall College of Law alumni
Cleveland–Marshall College of Law alumni
Cleveland–Marshall College of Law alumni